Hopton Wafers is a civil parish in Shropshire, England.  It contains 26 listed buildings that are recorded in the National Heritage List for England.  Of these, three are at Grade II*, the middle of the three grades, and the others are at Grade II, the lowest grade.  The parish contains the village of Hopton Wafers, the smaller settlement of Doddington, and the surrounding countryside.  The listed buildings include houses and farmhouses, some of which are timber framed, two churches, memorials and tombs in a churchyard, a country house and associated structures, two bridges, and a war memorial.

Key

Buildings

References

Citations

Sources

Lists of buildings and structures in Shropshire